Sibylle was a 40-gun frigate of the French Navy. She was built as Minerva in Napoli, and surrendered to France on 14 July 1801.

In September 1801, she was commissioned for the Toulon squadron, and in December, she sailed to Toulon under Commander Jean-Jacques Magendie. On the 24 of that month, she joined French service as Sibylle.

In 1802, she served off Saint-Domingue in a squadron also comprising, Duquesne and Intrépide, and commanded by Pierre Maurice Julien de Quérangal.

Sibylle was returned to Napoli on 5 May 1803.

Sources and references

Age of Sail frigates of France
1791 ships
Ships built in Naples